Gojong (8 September 1852 – 21 January 1919) was the monarch of Korea from 1864 to 1907. He reigned as the last King of Joseon from 1864 to 1897, and as the first Emperor of Korea from 1897 until his forced abdication in 1907. He is also known as the Gwangmu Emperor.

He was instrumental in the forced signing of the Treaty of Ganghwa (1876), an unequal treaty which would eventually pave the way for Japanese annexation of Korea. In 1895, his wife Queen Min was assassinated by Japanese agents, strengthening the king's antipathy towards the Japanese. Gojong declared Korea an empire in 1897, which ended the country's historic subordination to the Qing dynasty. His slow pace in issuing reforms led to conflict with the Independence Club, but he saw more success when carrying out the Gwangmu Reform along military, economic and educational lines. Later, Gojong was subjected to several assassination and abdication attempts; eventually forced to abdicate, he was confined in a palace from where he tried unsuccessfully several times to seek refuge outside of Korea but eventually died in the Deoksugung Palace. There is suspicion that he was poisoned by Japanese officials.

Biography

Early life 
Gojong was born in Jeongseonbang, a province of Hanseong. He was the son of Yi Ha-eung. After Cheoljong of Joseon died without son, Andong Kim clan nominated him as the next King. Gojong became Prince Ik-seon shortly before his coronation. He entered the palace on 9 December 1863, and his father and mother were ennobled.

Early reign

On 13 December 1863, Gojong was crowned in Injeong gate of Changdeokgung. He was only twelve years old when he was crowned. Queen Sinjeong acted as regent until he became an adult. His father, Prince Heungseon Daewongun, assisted in the affairs of Queen Sinjeong's regency. In 1866, when the queen proclaimed the abolishment of the regency, Gojong's rule started. On 6 March 1866, Min Chi-rok's daughter, Lady Min was selected as the new queen. Even though Gojong's father Daewongun had no rights to maintain the regency, he still acted as regent illegally.
 
During the mid-1860s, the Daewongun was the main proponent of isolationism and was responsible for the persecution of native and foreign Catholics, a policy that led directly to the French and the United States' expeditions to Korea, in 1866 and 1871 respectively. The early years of the Daewongun's rule also witnessed a concerted effort to restore the largely dilapidated Gyeongbok Palace, the seat of royal authority. During this time, the Seowon (private academies that often doubled as epicenters of factional power), and the power wielded by the Andong Kim clan in particular was dismantled.

Finally in 1873, Gojong announced the assumption of his direct royal rule. In November 1874, with the retirement of the Daewongun, Gojong's consort, Queen Min (posthumously known as Empress Myeongseong) and Yeoheung Min clan, gained complete control over the court, filling senior court positions with members of her family.

Gojong tried to strengthen the king's authority by giving important positions to consort kins and royal family members. Its known that Min Young-hwan, who was a distant relative of Queen Min, was Gojong's favorite official.

External pressures and unequal treaties

In the 19th century, tensions mounted between Qing China and Imperial Japan, culminating in the First Sino-Japanese War in 1894–1895. Much of this war was fought on the Korean peninsula. Japan, having acquired Western military technology after the Meiji Restoration, secured a victory against Joseon forces in Ganghwa Island, forcing Joseon to sign the Treaty of Ganghwa in 1876. Japan encroached upon Korean territory in search of fish, iron ore, and other natural resources. It also established a strong economic presence in the peninsula, heralding the beginning of Japanese Imperial expansion in East Asia. These events were the roots of Gojong's antipathy to the Japanese Empire.

The Treaty of Ganghwa became the first unequal treaty signed between Korea and a foreign country; it gave extraterritorial rights to Japanese citizens in Korea and forced the Korean government to open three ports, Busan, Incheon, and Wonsan, to Japanese and foreign trade. With the signing of such a lopsided treaty, Korea became easy prey for competing imperialistic powers, paving the way for Korea's annexation by Japan.

Imo Rebellion and Gapsin Coup

King Gojong began to rely on a new paid army (byeolgigun) of soldiers equipped with rifles. These new armies were requested by the Gaehwa Party and was supervised by Yun Ung-nyeol. In contrast to the well-armed army, the old army had not received a salary for 13 months. The tattered army was finally paid one month's salary. Enraged, the old army sparked a riot, and the Daewongun seized power. When the Imo Incident happened, Queen Min requested the Qing Empire for military support. On 27 June 1882, the Qing deployed about 3,000 soldiers in Seoul. They kidnapped the Daewongun on 7 July 1882, which led the Min family to regain political power.

During the Imo incident when Queen Min was taking refuge in her relative's villa, Lady Seon-yeong of the Yeongwol Eom clan showed extreme devotion towards King Gojong. He rewarded her fealty by promoting her to the rank of Jimil Sanggung (5th senior rank of Women of the Internal Court).

On 4 December 1884, five revolutionaries attempted a coup d'état by leading a small anti-old minister army to detain King Gojong and Queen Min. These revolutionaries tried to remove the Qing army from Korea. The Gapsin Coup failed after 3 days. Some of its leaders, including Kim Okgyun, fled to Japan, and others were executed.

Peasant revolts

Widespread poverty presented significant challenges to the 19th century Joseon Dynasty. Starvation was rampant, and much of the populace lived in run-down shanties lined along dirt roads. Famine, poverty, crushing taxes, and corruption among the ruling class, led to many notable peasant revolts in the 19th century.

In 1894, the Donghak Peasant Revolution took hold as an anti-government, anti-yangban, and anti-foreign campaign. One leading cause of the revolution was the tax system implemented by Queen Min. Gojong asked for the assistance from the Chinese and Japanese to crush the revolution. Yi Jun-yong and others coordinated with peasants to assassinate Gojong. However, the plot was leaked and the revolution failed. Although the revolution ultimately failed, many of the peasants' grievances were later addressed with the Gabo Reform.

One of the biggest reforms in 1894 was abolishing the slave (nobi) system, which had existed as far back as the Gojoseon period.

The assassination of Queen Min

In 1895, Empress Myeongseong was assassinated by Japanese agents. The Japanese minister to Korea, Miura Gorō, orchestrated the plot against her. A group of Japanese agents entered Gyeongbokgung in Seoul, which was under guard by Korean troops sympathetic to the Japanese, and the queen was killed in the palace. The queen had attempted to counter Japanese interference in Korea and was considering turning to Russia or China for support.

Anti-Japanese sentiments in Korea
In 1895 Japan won the First Sino-Japanese War, expanding its influence over the Korean government. The Gabo reforms and the assassination of the queen stirred controversy in Korea, fomenting Korean anti-Japanese sentiment. Gojong's antipathy toward the Japanese intensified, and he turned to Russia as an ally by signing Russia–Korea Treaty of 1884. He sent many emissaries to Russian Empire.

Some Confucian scholars, as well as farmers, formed over 60 successive righteous armies to fight for Korean freedom. These armies were preceded by the Donghak movement and succeeded by various Korean independence movements.

Internal exile to the Russian legation

Pro-Japanese government grew, while anti-Japanese politicians were either killed or fled for their survival after the Chun Sang Door Incident in 1895. Gojong perceived the need for refuge.

On 11 February 1896, King Gojong and his crown prince fled from the Gyeongbokgung to the Russian legation in Seoul, from which they governed for about one year, an event known as Gojong's internal exile to the Russian legation. Because of staying in the Russian legation many concessions of Korea were taken by Russia. Gojong sent Min Young-hwan to the coronation of Nicholas II of Russia. Min returned to Korea in October 1896 with Russian Army instructors. These instructors were able to train guards which enabled Gojong to return to palace in February 1897.

Emperor of Korea

On 13 October 1897, yielding to rising pressure from overseas and the demands of the Independence Association-led public opinion, King Gojong returned to Gyeongungung (modern-day Deoksugung). He declared himself emperor, changed the country's name to the Great Korean Empire, and declared a new era name Gwangmu (Hangul: 광무, Hanja: 光武) (meaning, "shining and martial"). This effectively ended Korea's historic subordination to the Qing empire, which Korea had acknowledged since the fall of the Ming Dynasty. He took the title of Gwangmu Emperor, and was formally crowned emperor in Wongudan. He changed the name of country to Great Han. On the same day, Gojong appointed the Crown Prince as Imperial Crown Prince. Proclamation of the empire brought conflict against the Qing dynasty, which used to be the only imperial state of East Asia. This conflict was resolved by not mentioning the title of the two emperors.

When the Daewongun died in 1898, Emperor Gwangmu refused to attend the funeral of his father as the relationship between father and son had broken down irretrievably. But it was also reported that the emperor's cries could be heard when he looked over the palace wall. On 17 August 1899, Gojong proclaimed the Great-han declaration law. This law gave absolute power to Gojong.

Even though Gojong had absolute power, he did not despise Constitutional monarchy. He promised with members of the Independence Club that he would perform reforms. However, these reforms were not carried out quickly, which angered members of the Independence Club. While, the conservative politicians spread rumors that the Independence Club is trying to abolish the empire and proclaim a republic, which in turn led Gojong to abolish the Independence Club.

Gojong knew the need of modernizing his country and especially the military. Having a stronger army was another way for increasing the authority of the Emperor. Russian instructors that Min Young-hwan brought had the main tasks of modernizing the army. Gojong was pleased with Russian instructions. In March 1898, Russian instructors returned to Russia. Gojong ordered Ministry of Military to strengthen the army. By the request of the Minister of Military, Yi Jong-geon, Military academy was established in April 1898. In order to command both army and navy, Gojong appointed himself as the Grand Field Marshal of the Imperial Korean Army, and Crown Prince as Field Marshal on 29 June 1898. On 2 July 1898, Gojong established the full control of the army. Board of Marshals was established on 1 August 1899. In 1899, Gojong bought a lot of weapons from different countries. Gojong noticed that new officers need learnings from modernized military academies. He sent many cadets to Imperial Japanese Army Academy. More and more army units were formed around the country. By July 1900, there were 17,000 men of the Jinwidae. In 1901, about 44 percent of the total revenue was used for military. Gojong tried to augment his authority in military by Board of Marshals. Board of Marshals became the supreme high command of the army.

Gojong was subjected to many assassination or abdication attempts. First in July 1898, Ahn Gyeong-su, the Minister of Military tried to abdicate Gojong. Ahn was executed for conspiracy on 28 May 1900. Second, on 12 September 1898, Kim Hong-rok tried to assassinate Gojong with by instilling poison in Gojong's coffee. In 1904, some Korean students in Japan tried to abdicate Gojong and make Prince Imperial Ui the emperor.

In 1904–1905, Japan was the victor in the Russo-Japanese War. Amidst the war, there were diplomatic efforts to keep Korea independent, including that of Korean Chargé d'Affaires Yi Han-eung in London who desperately tried to gain support from United Kingdom. But the latter already had common interests with Japan under the Anglo-Japanese Alliance and Lord Lansdowne in the British Foreign Office had ignored his diplomatic request. Yi Han-eung killed himself in May 1905 as protest; Gojong mourned his tragic death as his remains returned to Korea by ship.

When these acts of Gojong were revealed by the Japanese, the Japanese tried to remove him. On July 20, 1907, Gojong was removed. Gojong's son Sunjong succeeded him to the throne. Some officials, such as Park Yung-hyo, and Yi Do-Jae, tried to assassinate the cabinet of Ye Wanyong, who led the abdication.

After abdication
After abdicating, Emperor Gojong was confined to Deoksu Palace. In June 1910, Gojong tried to gain refuge in Primorsky Krai and establish a provincial government, but failed. On 22 August 1910, the Empire of Korea was annexed by Japan under the Japan-Korea Annexation Treaty. In the treaty, Gojong lost his title as a former emperor; instead, he received a new title, "King Emeritus Yi of Deoksu" (徳寿宮李太王), and was recognized as a member of the imperial family of Japan. In 1915, Gojong tried to flee with the help of Sangsul but the attempt failed. Also with Lee Hoe-yeong, Gojong tried to seek refuge in 1918 to Beijing as he expected it would draw the attention of diplomats.

Gojong died suddenly on 21 January 1919 at Deoksugung Palace at the age of 66. There is much speculation that he was killed by poison administered by Japanese officials, an idea that gained wide circulation and acceptance at the time of his death. His death and subsequent funeral proved a catalyst for the March First Movement for Korean independence from Japanese rule. He is buried with his wife at the imperial tomb of Hongneung (홍릉, 洪陵) in the city of Namyangju, Gyeonggi.

Family
 Father
Yi Ha-Eung, King Heungseon (21 December 1820 – 22 February 1898) (흥선왕 이하응)
 Grandfather: Yi Gu, Prince Namyeon (22 August 1788 – 19 March 1836) (이구 남연군)
 Grandmother: Princess Consort Min of the Yeoheung Min clan (26 June 1788 – 1831) (군부인 여흥민씨, 驪興府大夫人 閔氏)
 Legal Father: Yi Yeong, King Munjo of Joseon (18 September 1809 – 25 June 1830) (조선의 문조 이영)
 Mother
 Queen Sunmok of the Yeoheung Min clan (3 February 1818 – 8 January 1898) (순목왕비 민씨)
Grandfather: Min Chi-Gu (1795 – 14 December 1874) (민치구, 閔致久)
Grandmother: Lady Yi of the Jeonju Yi clan (? – 17 November 1873) (정경부인 전주이씨, 貞敬夫人 全州李氏)
 Legal Mother: Queen Shinjeong of the Pungyang Jo clan (21 January 1809 - 4 June 1890) (신정왕후 조씨)
 Consorts and their Respective Issue(s):
 Min Ja-yeong, Empress Myeongseong of the Yeoheung Min clan (17 November 1851 – 8 October 1895) (명성황후 민자영 민씨)
 Second son (4 November 1871 - 8 November 1871)Was given title of Prince Royal (원자, 元子) before he died
 Second daughter (3 February 1873 - 28 September 1873)
 Yi Cheok, Emperor Yunghui (25 March 1874 – 24 April 1926) (융희제 이척), third son
 Fourth son (5 April 1875 - 18 April 1875)
 Sixth son (18 February 1878 - 5 June 1878)
 Eom Seon-yeong, Imperial Noble Consort Sunheon of the Yeongwol Eom clan (2 February 1854 – 20 July 1911) (순헌황귀비 엄선영 엄씨)
Yi Un, Crown Prince Uimin (20 October 1897 – 1 May 1970) (이은 의민태자), seventh son
 Yang Chun-gi, Imperial Consort Boknyeong Gwi-in of the Cheongju Yang clan (27 September 1882 – 30 May 1929) (복녕당 귀인 양씨)
Princess Deokhye (25 May 1912 – 21 April 1989) (덕혜옹주), fourth daughter
Yi Sun-ah, Imperial Consort Yeongbo Gwi-in of the Gyeongju Yi clan (1849 – 17 December 1928) (영보당귀인 이씨)
 Yi Seon, Prince Wanhwa (16 April 1868 – 12 January 1880) (이선 완화군), first son
 First daughter (1871 – 1872)
 Imperial Consort Gwi-in of the Deoksu Jang clan (귀인 장씨)
Yi Kang, Prince Uihwa (30 March 1877 – August 1955) (이강 의화군), fifth son
 Imperial Consort Naeandang Gwi-in of the Gyeongju Yi clan (1847 – 13 February 1914) (내안당 귀인 이씨)
 Third daughter (1879 – 1880)
Imperial Consort Bohyeon Gwi-in of the Haeju Jeong clan (23 February 1882 – 1943) (보현당 귀인 정씨)
 Prince Yi U (20 August 1915 – 25 July 1916) (이우), ninth son
 Lee Wan-deok, Imperial Consort Gwanghwa Gwi-in of the Lee clan (1885 – 10 November 1965) (광화당 귀인 이씨) 
 Prince Yi Yuk (3 July 1914 –  22 January 1915) (이육), eighth son
 Kim Ok-gi, Lady Kim of the Andong Kim clan of Samchuk Hall (1890 – 23 September 1970) (삼축당 김씨)
 Court Lady Kim of the Gwangsan Kim clan of Jeonghwa Hall (정화당 상궁 김씨)

Honours
Korean honours
 Founder and Sovereign of the Grand Order of the Golden Ruler – 17 April 1900
 Founder and Sovereign of the Grand Order of the Auspicious Stars – 12 August 1902
 Founder and Sovereign of the Grand Order of the Plum Blossoms – 17 April 1900
 Founder and Sovereign of the Order of the National Crest – 17 April 1900
 Founder and Sovereign of the Order of the Purple Falcon – 16 April 1901
 Founder and Sovereign of the Order of the Eight Trigrams – 16 April 1901
 Grand Cordon of the Grand Order of the Auspicious Phoenix – 1907

Foreign honours
: Grand Cross of the Order of Saints Maurice and Lazarus – 23 July 1895
: Grand Cross of the Legion of Honour – 23 July 1895

Grand Cordon of the Order of the Chrysanthemum – 23 March 1897
Korean Colonization Decoration - 1 August 1912
: Honorary Grand Commander of the Order of the Indian Empire – 17 December 1900
: Grand Cross of the Order of Charles III, with Collar – 1900
: Grand Cordon of the Royal Order of Leopold – 23 March 1901
: Order of the Double Dragon, Class I Grade I – 1 December 1903
: Knight of the Order of St. Stanislaus, 1st Class – 1 December 1903
: Knight of the Order of the Elephant – 31 August 1903
: Knight of the Order of the Black Eagle – 20 March 1904

Ancestry

In popular culture 
 Portrayed by Lee Jin-woo and Lee Joon in the 2001-2002 KBS2 TV series Empress Myeongseong.
 Portrayed by Kim Young-min in the 2009 film The Sword with No Name.
 Portrayed by Choi Jong-hwan in the 2010 SBS TV series Jejungwon.
 Portrayed by Park Hee-soon in the 2012 film Gabi.
 Portrayed by Lee Min-woo in the 2014 KBS2 TV series Gunman in Joseon.
 Portrayed by Park Min-sang in the 2016 film The Map Against The World.
 Portrayed by Baek Yoon-sik in the 2016 film The Last Princess.
 Portrayed by Kang Yi-seok and Lee Seung-joon in the 2018 tvN TV series Mr. Sunshine.

See also
History of Korea
Rulers of Korea
Heungseon Daewongun
Empress Myeongseong
List of Head of State and Government deposed by foreign power in the 20th and 21st century

Notes

References

Works cited

External links

 "Essays Trace US, Japan Roles in Joseon's Downfall" Korea Times, June 13, 2008

Korean Empire emperors
1852 births
1919 deaths
19th-century Korean monarchs
Monarchs who abdicated
Grand Croix of the Légion d'honneur
Knights Grand Cross of the Order of Saints Maurice and Lazarus
Honorary Knights Grand Commander of the Order of the Indian Empire
Flag designers
People from Seoul